Shiyangtang Town is an urban town in You County, Hunan Province, People's Republic of China.

Administrative divisions
The town is divided into 14 villages and one district: Wangmalou District, Nantian Village, Dashuiqiao Village, Hejiaping Village, Zhoushangtian Village, Huangjialong Village, Jiatai Village, Bahechong Village, Jinkeng Village, Luojiaqiao Village, Laohuyan Village, Shida Village, Jieshi Village, Tanjialong Village, and Tianxing Village.

References

External links

Divisions of You County